The Early Childhood Care and Development (ECCD) Council is a national government agency in the Philippines first tasked as a coordinating body on early childhood education by virtue of Republic Act 8980 of 2000, and officially established as a Council in 2009 through Executive Order No. 778. In 2013, R.A. 10410 or the “Early Years Act of 2013” also known as the EYA Law was enacted. This is “An Act Recognizing The Age From Zero (0) To Eight (8) Years As The First Crucial Stage Of Educational Development And Strengthening The Early Childhood Care And Development System (ECCD System) Appropriating Funds Therefor and For Other Purposes.” PAGCOR funds majority of the Council’s programs.

Guided by the responsibilities specified in the EYA Law, the Council focuses on the establishment of the national ECCD system that shall ensure the implementation of quality ECCD programs. The ECCD system has four major components, namely: ECCD curriculum; parent education and involvement, advocacy and mobilization of communities; human resource development, and ECCD management.  The Council is tasked to: establish national ECCD standards, develop policies and programs, ensure compliance thereof, and provide technical assistance as well as program support to ECCD service providers.

Of paramount importance is the partnership that the Council has developed since 2014 with local government units, especially in the establishment of National Child Development Centers (NCDCs). The Council provides funds for the construction of the NCDC and teaching-learning resources. For its part, the local government provides the required land area and its development, the perimeter fence and playground structures.

The Council consists of a Governing Board and a Council Secretariat. The member agencies of the Council are also its core partners, namely: the Department of Education, Department of Social Welfare and Development (DSWD), Department of Health (DOH), National Nutrition Council (NNC), the Union of Local Authorities of the Philippines (ULAP) and a private ECCD practitioner.

References

External links

Government of the Philippines
Early childhood education